Wickham Island off the Kimberley coast of Western Australia is a small island in the Timor Sea.

References

Islands of the Kimberley (Western Australia)